The spectacled prickletail (Siptornis striaticollis) is a species of bird in the family Furnariidae. Its genus, Siptornis, is monotypic. It is found in the Andes of southwestern Colombia, Ecuador and far northern Peru. Its natural habitat is subtropical or tropical moist montane forests.

References

spectacled prickletail
Birds of the Colombian Andes
Birds of the Ecuadorian Andes
spectacled prickletail
Taxonomy articles created by Polbot